Emerson Rodrigues Brito (born 6 May 2002), commonly known as Emerson, is a Brazilian professional footballer who plays as a left-winger and right-winger for Javor-Matis in the Serbian Superliga.

Club career

Grêmio
Born in Santa Cruz do Sul, Brazil, Emerson joined the Grêmio's Academy at the age of 18 in 2020.

Emerson is currently playing in Serbia, for the Serbian Superliga side Javor-Matis.

Career statistics

Club

Honours
Grêmio
Recopa Gaúcha: 2022

References

External links

2002 births
Living people
Brazilian footballers
Association football forwards
Clube Esportivo Bento Gonçalves players